De brug (The bridge) is a 1928 Dutch documentary silent short film directed by  Joris Ivens. This silent film explores the then-newly constructed Koningshaven Bridge in Rotterdam, a vertical-lift railroad bridge. The film looks at its structure, mechanisms, complex actions, and the steam-powered trains and ships making use of it.

Synopsis 
Three views of the film camera appear "as if in a technical drawing. It then proceeds to examine the bridge from all angles." The bridge is shown in ultrawide format, then wide, then in close-up, from a train rider's viewpoint. The view shifts to outside the train looking down at the harbor water far below, then to clouds of steam obscuring and revealing the bridge's steel structure. A worker ascends, inspects, observes the surrounding environs, and descends the superstructure. From a vantage point between two train cars coupled together, the countryside flits by as the train makes its way to the bridge. The bridgemaster at the control console commands the raising of the central section, and the massive alignment grooves, pulleys, cables, and counterweights are all detailed in their steady synchronized operation until the bridge's maximum height of 38 meters is reached. Sailing and steam ships then make their way under the raised bridge, while the steam train waits, puffing. The bridge descends, the counterweights rise, and the train continues on its way.

History 
Ivens founded and remained involved in the Amsterdam film-league (Filmliga), while he managed his father's photographic business and attended university. Ivens' "first enthusiasm was the abstract films sent to them — sometimes brought to them — from Germany by new film directors Ruttmann, Eggeling, Richter, and others,"  and De Brug, one of Ivens' first ventures into filmmaking, followed in a similar vein.

In the 1920s, the modern, technology-oriented city of Rotterdam had become quite popular. The construction of its new lifting bridge (Hefbrug, or De Hef) was covered extensively in the press, and inspired artists as well. Ivens called the bridge "a laboratory of movements, tones, shapes, contrasts, rhythms, and the relations between all of these." He climbed the bridge over a period of months and filmed it "day after day" on lunch breaks, searching for "expressive angles."

According to van Ulzen, Ivens' "almost entirely abstract" film achieved immediate world fame.  De Brug was described in the British journal CLOSEUP (1928) as a "pure visual symphony."

Notes

References

External links 

1928 documentary films
1928 films
Dutch black-and-white films
Dutch short documentary films
Dutch silent short films
Films directed by Joris Ivens
Black-and-white documentary films
Documentary films about architecture
Bridges in Rotterdam
Films about bridges
1920s short documentary films